Abul Eleij  is a Syrian village located in Sinjar Nahiyah in Maarrat al-Nu'man District, Idlib. According to the Syria Central Bureau of Statistics (CBS), Abul Eleij had a population of 340 in the 2004 census.

References 

Populated places in Maarat al-Numan District